Tom Remlov (born 21 July 1949) is a Norwegian actor, dramaturg, film producer, theatre director, and opera manager.

He served as theatre director of Den Nationale Scene from 1986 to 1995, and was manager of Norsk Film from 1996 to 2001. He was manager of the Norwegian National Opera and Ballet from 2008. He resigned in July 2014, but becomes the new director of Riksteatret in April 2015.

He was decorated Knight, First Class of the Order of St. Olav in 2015.

References

1949 births
Living people
Male actors from Oslo
Norwegian male actors
Norwegian theatre directors
Norwegian opera directors